Ladislaus Szilágyi (born at the end of the 14th century) was a Hungarian nobleman, general, captain of the fortress of Bradics,

Sources
Fraknói Vilmos: Michael Szilágyi, The uncle of King Matthias (Bp., 1913)
W.Vityi Zoltán: King Matthias maternal relatives
Felsőmagyarországi Minerva: nemzeti folyó-irás, Volumul 6

References 

Ladislaus
Hungarian nobility